Ibrahim Sillah (born 4 April 1995) is a Sierra Leonean footballer who plays as a midfielder for Kickers Emden.

International career
Sillah was called up to the Sierra Leone national team in March 2022.

Career statistics

Club

Notes

International

References

1995 births
Living people
Association football midfielders
Sierra Leonean footballers
Sierra Leone international footballers
Serie D players
Asser Christelijke Voetbalvereniging players
Kickers Emden players
Sierra Leonean expatriate footballers
Sierra Leonean expatriate sportspeople in the Netherlands
Expatriate footballers in the Netherlands
Sierra Leonean expatriate sportspeople in Germany
Expatriate footballers in Germany